The Burusho, or Brusho, also known as the Botraj, are an ethnolinguistic group indigenous to the Yasin, Hunza, Nagar, and other valleys of Gilgit–Baltistan in northern Pakistan, as well as in Jammu and Kashmir, India. Their language, Burushaski, has been classified as a language isolate.

Although their origins are unknown, it is claimed that the Burusho people "were indigenous to northwestern India and were pushed higher into the mountains by the movements of the Indo-Aryans, who traveled southward sometime around 1800 B.C."

History 

Prior to the modern era, the area in which most Burusho now live was part of the independent state of Gilgit. The state was a hereditary monarchy, controlled by the Tarkhan dynasty of probably Turkic descent, and headed by a ra (derived from raja, a title usually translated as king). Later this territory became subjugated to British Raj.  Now it is part of Pakistan.

The construction of the Karakoram Highway during the 1970s brought more extensive contact with the outside world. Many traders, preachers, tourists, and others had new access to the Burusho's homeland, and this subsequently altered the culture and local economy of the area.

The Burusho are known for their love of music and dance, along with their progressive views towards education and women.

Hunza

Clark and Lorimer reported frequent violence and starvation in Hunza.

Upper Hunza, locally called Gojal, is inhabited by people whose ancestors moved up from proper Hunza to irrigate and defend the borders with China and Afghanistan. They speak a dialect called Wakhi, which is influenced by Burushahski and Pamiri languages due to the closeness and contact with these mountain communities. The Shina-speaking people live in the southern Hunza. They have come from Chilas, Gilgit, and other Shina-speaking areas of Pakistan.

Longevity myth 
A widely repeated claim of remarkable longevity of the Hunza people has been refuted as a longevity myth, citing a life expectancy of 53 years for men and 52 for women, although with a high standard deviation. There is no evidence that Hunza life expectancy is significantly above the average of poor, isolated regions of Pakistan. Claims of health and long life were almost always based solely on the statements by the local mir (king). An author who had significant and sustained contact with Burusho people, John Clark, reported that they were overall unhealthy.

Jammu and Kashmir
A group of 350 Burusho people also reside in the Indian union territory of Jammu and Kashmir, being mainly concentrated in Batamalu, as well as in Botraj Mohalla, which is southeast of Hari Parbat. This Burusho community is descended from two former princes of the British Indian princely states of Hunza and Nagar, who with their families, migrated to this region in the 19th century A.D. They are known as the Botraj by other ethnic groups in the state, and practice Shiite Islam. Arranged marriages are customary.

Since the partition of India in 1947, the Indian Burusho community have not been in contact with the Pakistani Burusho. The Government of India has granted the Burusho community Scheduled Tribe status, as well as reservation, and therefore, "most members of the community are in government jobs." The Burusho people of India speak Burushashki, also known as Khajuna, and their dialect, known as Jammu & Kashmir Burushashski (JKB), "has undergone several changes which make it systematically different from other dialects of Burushaski spoken in Pakistan". In addition, many Jammu & Kashmiri Burusho are multilingual, also speaking Kashmiri and Hindustani, as well as Balti and Shina to a lesser extent.

Genetics
A variety of Y-DNA haplogroups are seen among certain random samples of people in Hunza. Some haplogroups found in the Burusho were R1a1 and R2a, the former of which is associated with Indo-European peoples and the Bronze Age migration into South Asia c. 2000 BC, and probably originated in either South Asia,
 Central Asia or Iran and Caucasus. R2a, unlike its extremely rare parent R2, R1a1 and other clades of haplogroup R, is now virtually restricted to South Asia. Two other typically South Asian lineages, haplogroup H1 and haplogroup L3 (defined by SNP mutation M20) have also been observed from few samples.

Other Y-DNA haplogroups reaching considerable frequencies among the Burusho are haplogroup J2, associated with the spread of agriculture in, and from, the neolithic Near East, and haplogroup C3, of East Eurasian male origin and possibly representing the patrilineage of Genghis Khan. Present at lower frequency are haplogroups O3, also of East Eurasian male lineage, and Q Siberian male origin, P, F, and G. DNA research groups the male ancestry of some of the Hunza inhabitants with speakers of Pamir languages and other mountain communities of various ethnicities, due primarily to the M124 marker (defining Y-DNA haplogroup R2a), which is present at high frequency in these populations. However, they have also an East Asian genetic contribution, suggesting that at least some of their ancestry originates north of the Himalayas. No Greek genetic component among the Burusho have been detected in tests.

Influence in the Western world
Healthy living advocate J. I. Rodale wrote a book called The Healthy Hunzas in 1948 that asserted that the Hunzas, noted for their longevity and many centenarians, were long-lived because they consumed healthy organic foods, such as dried apricots and almonds, and had plenty of fresh air and exercise. He often mentioned them in his Prevention magazine as exemplary of the benefits of leading a healthy lifestyle.

Dr. John Clark stayed among the Hunza people for 20 months and in his 1956 book Hunza - Lost Kingdom of the Himalayas writes: "I wish also to express my regrets to those travelers whose impressions have been contradicted by my experience. On my first trip through Hunza, I acquired almost all the misconceptions they did: The Healthy Hunzas, the Democratic Court, The Land Where There Are No Poor, and the rest—and only long-continued living in Hunza revealed the actual situations". Regarding the misconception about Hunza people's health, Clark also writes that most of his patients had malaria, dysentery, worms, trachoma, and other health conditions easily diagnosed and quickly treated. In his first two trips he treated 5,684 patients.

The October 1953 issue of National Geographic had an article on the Hunza River Valley that inspired Carl Barks' story Tralla La.

See also
 Hunza Valley
 Burushaski language
 Kalash people
 Brokpa people

References

Bibliography

External links
Humans of Hunza
 Hunza People

 
Social groups of Gilgit Baltistan
Ethnic groups in Pakistan
Longevity
Social groups of Pakistan
Social groups of Jammu and Kashmir
Hunza
Hindu Kush
Karakoram
Scheduled Tribes of Jammu and Kashmir